Romsley (grid reference SO783826) is a hamlet and civil parish in southeast Shropshire, England. It is bounded on the north and west by Alveley and on the south by Upper Arley in Worcestershire. On its short eastern boundary it meets Compton on Kinver. It is a dispersed settlement and there is no church in the parish. The parish is mainly a farming community, comprising only 36 houses in 1961.

History
The lane running along the crest of the ridge of Shatterford Hill is called the Micclan strete (great made-road), mentioned in the Anglo-Saxon bounds of Wolverley. This may have been part of an ancient road from Gloucester and Worcester to Chester. This became part of the Kidderminster to Bridgnorth turnpike road, until a new easier road (now the A442) was built further west in the 1830s.

See also
Listed buildings in Romsley, Shropshire

References

Hamlets in Shropshire
Civil parishes in Shropshire